Republic Airport  is a regional airport in East Farmingdale, New York, located one mile east of Farmingdale village limits.

The National Plan of Integrated Airport Systems for 2011–2015 categorized it as a general aviation reliever airport. Federal Aviation Administration records say the airport had 3,586 passenger boardings (enplanements) in calendar year 2008, 2,866 in 2009, and 2,783 in 2010.

On behalf of NY State's Department of Transportation, the airport is currently managed by AvPORTS, a US-based and owned operator and manager of airports.

History
Republic Airport was developed by Sherman Fairchild as the Fairchild Flying Field in East Farmingdale on Long Island, NY in late 1927 as his flying field and airplane factory on Motor Avenue in South Farmingdale was inadequate to support the mass production of his Fairchild FC-2 and Fairchild 71 airplanes. Fairchild purchased property on the south side of Route 24-Conklin Street and had the airport's original layout plan prepared on November 3, 1927.

The  flying field was developed in the late winter and early spring of 1928 and was originally owned and operated by Fairchild Engine & Airplane Manufacturing Company. The first flights from the Fairchild Flying Field took place in late spring of 1928 after the Fairchild Airplane and Airplane Engine factories and hangar were completed and aircraft were produced in the new factories. After Fairchild moved to Hagerstown, Maryland in 1931, Grumman Aircraft Engineering built planes at the airport from 1932 until the spring of 1937.

Seversky Aircraft moved there in January 1935 from College Point in Queens, and became Republic Aviation in 1939. Republic built more than 9,000 P-47 Thunderbolts in Farmingdale during World War II and expanded Republic Field, erected three hangars and a control tower and lengthened and hardened the runways. Republic built the straight-wing F-84 Thunderjet and the swept-wing F-84 Thunderstreak during the Korean War (1952 airport diagram) and extended runway 14–32 to the southeast over the objections of Long Island State Parks Commissioner Robert Moses.

Republic Aviation produced over 800 F-105 Thunderchief fighter bombers during the Vietnam Era. Republic Aviation was acquired by the Fairchild-Hiller Corp. in 1965 for $24.5 million and Fairchild stock. Flight Safety Inc. ran the Republic Airport as a general aviation airport beginning on December 7, 1966, for the Mailman brothers' Farmingdale Corporation, which had purchased the field from Fairchild Hiller for $8 million in 1965.

Republic Airport was acquired by the Metropolitan Transportation Authority (MTA) on March 31, 1969. The MTA installed an instrument landing system (ILS) on runway 14–32, built the Republic Airport Terminal building, cooperated with the Federal Aviation Administration, which built the new 100' high control tower and got the US Government to transfer  to the airport in 1971 and purchased the  Lambert property on the north side of Route 109 and the Breslau Gardens property between New Highway and Route 109 in 1972.

After complaints that the MTA was not contributing taxes to local governments and questions about the MTA spending at Republic, ownership of the airport was transferred to the New York State Department of Transportation (NYSDOT) by the New York State Legislature in April 1983, to promote economic development in the surrounding Long Island region. The Republic Airport Commission was created by the New York State Legislature in 1982 (Chap. 370, L.1982) "as an advisory council to the Commissioner of Transportation in the administration and management of the Republic Airport facilities and its surrounding areas with respect to projects to be undertaken at such airport." Fairchild went out of business in 1987, and much of its historic Fairchild-Republic factory complex was sold and developed as the Airport Plaza shopping mall.

The Long Island Republic Airport Historical Society, formed in 1984, and chartered by the Board of Regents of the State of New York in 1987, maintains sixteen photographic exhibits illustrating the history of aviation, and historical archives, on the first floor of the Republic Airport terminal building behind the FAA tower on the east side of Route 110.

The most recent exhibit illustrates: "The Origins of Airplane Manufacturing in Farmingdale, NY: The Foundation Years: 1917-1928," which documents airplanes built by Lawrence Sperry, Sydney Breese and Sherman Fairchild. The airport is also home to the American Airpower Museum which offers visitors the opportunity to see World War II aircraft in flight.

The airport has seen scheduled passenger airlines: on Cosmopolitan Airlines in the 1980s, Provincetown-Boston Airlines (operating as Continental Express) in the 1980s and Northwest Airlink in the 1990s.

Most NHL teams flying charter flights into Long Island to play the New York Islanders use Republic Airport.

Facilities and operations at KFRG
Republic Airport has a two-story terminal building serving passengers boarding charter flights to nearby cities such as Atlantic City, New Jersey. Three Fixed-base operators serve corporate and light general aviation customers: SheltAir, Republic Jet Center (affiliated with Signature Aviation), and Atlantic Aviation. U.S. Customs and Border Protection has an office at the terminal building; however, it is staffed by appointment only and pilots must request immigration services four hours prior to arrival. Next to the airport was the 56th Fighter Group restaurant, which closed in August 2012. Also, Troop L of the New York State Police, which provides highway patrol for state parkways in Nassau and Suffolk Counties, is headquartered at the airport.

Fire rescue

Republic Airport has a full-time Index A ARFF team located at the main headquarters and terminal building. The airport has two crash trucks (Rescue 3 and 4), and a support vehicle pickup truck (Rescue 1). The airport is also served by the East Farmingdale Volunteer Fire Company and Village of Farmingdale Fire Department when mutual aid is requested.

Republic Airport Fire Rescue also responds to aviation incidents in the general vicinity outside of the airport.

Runway and helipad information 
All runways have been repaved & resurfaced since 2022

14/32

1/19

Helipad H1

Helipad H2

Aircraft accidents at KFRG

1975
Lear Jet 25, N428JX, Incident occurred July 3, 1975

Takeoff was aborted but the Learjet continued off the runway with both engines at or near takeoff power. The airplane collided with trees.

1993
Swearingen SA226-TC Metro II, N220KC, Incident occurred August 17, 1993 (KFRG)

While approaching runway 02, the crew forgot to lower the landing gear. The circuit breaker for the gear warning horn had been pulled at some previous flights by other crew to prevent it from sounding during a high speed descent.

Propeller blades contacted the runway at a speed of 96 knots. When the crew tried to perform a go-around, the speed had dropped 10 knots. The aircraft cleared a stone wall, crashed into the water and sank into Connecticut River. Both crew members on board were pronounce deceased

2003
Lear Jet 35A, N135PT, Incident occurred August 4, 2003 (KFRG)

The flight departed Republic Airport about 06:10. About 5 miles west of Groton, the flightcrew advised the Providence Approach controller that they had made visual contact with the airport, and requested to cancel their IFR clearance. The controller acknowledged the request and terminated the clearance. The airplane entered the left downwind for runway 23 at Groton, at an altitude of 1,800 feet, and continued to descend. About 2.3 miles northeast of the runway, the airplane made a left turn onto base leg. About 1.5 miles from the runway, and south of the extended runway centerline, the airplane turned left, and back toward the right. When the airplane was about 1/8-mile south of the runway threshold, an approximate 60-degree right turn was made back toward the runway. The airplane crossed the runway at an altitude of 200 feet, and began a left turn towards the center of the airport. The turn continued, and the airplane re-entered a left downwind for the runway, about 1,100 feet south of the runway, at an altitude of 300 feet. According to eyewitnesses the airplane continued the left turn, increasing the bank angle to almost 90-degrees. As the airplane was turning final approach, it began to wobble from left to right, before contacting the rooftop of a single-story residential home about 1/4-mile northeast of the approach end of runway 23. The plane continued for about 800 feet through a small line of hardwood and evergreen trees, a second residential home, a second line of trees, a third residential home, down an embankment, and through a boardwalk, before coming to rest in the Poqonock River. The airplane was owned by JetPro and operated by Air East Management, according to NTSB and FAA data.

2007
Lear Jet 25, N125FT: Incident occurred August 12, 2007 (KFRG)

Sustained damage after encountering a hail storm. The airplane was withdrawn from use at Farmingdale and dismantled.

Cessna 650 Citation III N697MC: Incident occurred October 21, 2007 (KFRG)

The first officer was flying the Area Navigation, GPS, approach to runway 22 at Atlantic City International Airport, NJ (ACY). During the approach, the airplane was initially fast as the first officer had increased engine power to compensate for wind conditions. Descending below the minimum descent altitude (MDA), the first officer momentarily deployed the speed brakes, but stowed them about 200 feet agl, and reduced the engine power to flight idle. The airplane became low and slow, and developed an excessive sink rate. The airplane subsequently landed hard on runway 22, which drove the right main landing gear into the right wing, resulting in substantial damage to the right wing spar.

About the time of the accident, the recorded wind was from 190 degrees at 11 knots, gusting to 24 knots; and the captain believed that the airplane had encountered windshear near the MDA, with the flaps fully extended. Review of air traffic control data revealed that no windshear advisories were contained in the automated terminal information system broadcasts. Although the local controller provided windshear advisories to prior landing aircraft, he did not provide one to the accident aircraft. Review of the airplane flight manual (AFM) revealed that deploying the speed brakes below 500 feet agl, with the flaps in any position other than the retracted position, was prohibited.

2009
Cessna Grand Caravan N336DN: Incident occurred September 15, 2009 (KFRG)

A Cessna 208, N336DN, operated by North American Flight Services Inc., experienced a loss of engine power while climbing and performed a forced landing in Sheffield, MA. The airplane was destroyed by a post crash fire and the commercial-rated pilot and 5 passengers were not injured. Visual meteorological conditions prevailed and an instrument flight rules flight plan was filed for the flight that departed Farmingdale-Republic Field, NY (FRG), destined for the Saratoga Springs-Saratoga County Airport, NY. The five passengers were employees of an industrial services company. The flight transported blasting caps and ammonium nitrate used for blasting operations, which were stored in a metal box inside the airplane.

The pilot reported that the airplane departed FRG at 1405, and he initiated a climb to 9,000 feet without any abnormalities. As the airplane was climbing, and at an altitude of about 8,500 feet, the pilot heard two "whooshing" sounds, about 5 seconds apart. The engine then began to experience torque fluctuations. Shortly thereafter, the engine torque dropped to idle, and the pilot heard a "loud bang" and felt a "burst vibration."

The pilot declared an emergency to air traffic control and was told that the closest airport was located about 10 miles north, in Great Barrington, Massachusetts. The pilot informed air traffic control that the airplane would not be able to reach Great Barrington, and he subsequently performed a forced landing to a field.

During the landing, the airplane's right wing struck a tree and separated. All occupants exited the airplane without injury; however, the airplane became fully engulfed in fire, which consumed the majority of the airplane.

This Cessna 208 was the first production Caravan.

2021
Raytheon Hawker 800XP, N412JA: Accident occurred December 20, 2020 (KFRG)

The Federal Aviation Administration and National Transportation Safety Board are investigating after a  Raytheon Hawker 800XP landing gear collapsed at Republic Airport in East Farmingdale and the plane slid off the runway, federal officials said Monday.

The 2001 Raytheon Hawker 800XP operated by Talon Air carried two crew members but no passengers at the time of the Sunday night mishap, Talon Air spokeswoman Lisa Hendrickson said. According to records, the jet can seat 15, but Talon Air said this particular plane seats just eight.

Records confirmed by the Federal Aviation Administration show the flight departed Miami-Opa Locka Executive Airport at 6:16 p.m. Sunday and arrived at Republic at about 8:35 p.m. According to Suffolk County police, the landing gear on the jet had "failed to deploy," but the FAA said in a statement Monday that the jet "experienced nose and main gear collapse" upon landing at Republic.

It was not immediately clear if the crew had any indication of a gear problem before landing — or if they declared an emergency before the incident.

The names of the pilots have not been released.

The plane landed at 8:35 p.m. and someone aboard radioed: "Mayday, Mayday, Mayday Talon Air 941 crash-landing runway 1-4, we're still occupying, send vehicles out," according to the Aviation Safety Network's website.

Police said First Precinct officers responded to the airport shortly before 9 p.m. for a report that a small plane landed off the runway. The two occupants were transported to Nassau University Medical Center in East Meadow for treatment of minor injuries, authorities said.

East Farmingdale Fire Department Chief Duane Welliver said the plane "crashed on landing and slid across the runway. We don’t have any details on what caused the crash."

2022
Cessna 152, N64949: Incident occurred February 15, 2022 (KFRG)

Aircraft landed and veered off runway into the grass damaging a runway light.

See also

 Transportation in New York City
 List of airports in New York
 New York World War II Army airfields

References

External links
 Republic Airport, official site
 Republic Airport Fire Rescue, Facebook
 American Airpower Museum
 "Hundreds Attend Meeting on Republic Airport". Farmingdale Observer. August 18, 2000.
 Republic Airport (FRG) at NYSDOT Airport Directory
 Aerial image as of April 1994 from USGS The National Map
 
 

Babylon (town), New York
Airports established in 1927
Airfields of the United States Army Air Forces in New York (state)
Airfields of the United States Army Air Forces Technical Service Command
Airports in Suffolk County, New York
1927 establishments in New York (state)